The Centre Virtuel de la Connaissance sur l'Europe (French for "Virtual Centre for Knowledge on Europe "; abbreviated CVCE) is an interdisciplinary research and documentation centre dedicated to European integration studies. It develops a digital library of multimedia resources related to European unification efforts since World War II, including the development of related international bodies such as the European Union. The library is available in English and French, though some documents are available in other languages.

The CVCE is based in Sanem Castle in Luxembourg, and is supported by the Ministry of Culture, Higher Education and Research. It is a public corporation founded by law on 7 August 2002, and forms part of the University of Luxembourg.

The digital library was formerly named the European NAvigator (ENA).

The large multimedia knowledge base includes original texts (treaties, etc.), video and audio clips, press articles, photos, interactive maps, cartoons and tables.

Parts
 'Historical Events' contains material on all the events that have contributed to the European integration process;
 'European Organizations' looks at the operation of all the institutions of the European Union (e.g. European Parliament, European Commission) and the various other European institutions;
 'Special Files' are devoted to specific subjects;
 'Interviews' contains exclusive interviews with people who have played a part in the European integration process (Jacques Santer, Otto von Habsburg, etc.);
 'Research& Teaching' provides resources for teachers to enable their pupils to learn about European integration.

See also

European Integration
European Library
Europeana
History of the European Union

External links
 
 Digital Humanities LAB at CVCE - Blog

History of European integration
Geographic region-oriented digital libraries
Luxembourgian digital libraries
Internet and the European Union